Murray Anderson may refer to:

 Murray Anderson (ice hockey) (born 1949), retired Canadian ice hockey defenceman
 Murray Anderson (field hockey) (born 1968), South African former field hockey player
 Murray C. Anderson, South African composer, recording engineer and producer
 Admiral Sir David Murray Anderson (1874–1936), Governor of New South Wales

See also